Vishal–Shekhar are a music directing duo of Vishal Dadlani and Shekhar Ravjiani who have worked in Hindi, Telugu and Marathi films. Their works include Jhankaar Beats, Dus, Bluffmaster, Om Shanti Om, Bachna Ae Haseeno, Dostana, Chintakayala Ravi, Anjaana Anjaani, Ra.One, Student of the Year, Chennai Express, Bang Bang! and Happy New Year.

The duo rose to prominence when they composed the score for the film Jhankaar Beats which included the song "Tu Aashiqui Hai". They won the Filmfare RD Burman Award for New Music Talent for Jhankaar Beats. The music for the film Musafir combined techno music with Indian sounds. The score included "Saaki" and "Door Se Paas". In 2005 they composed the scores for three films: Salaam Namaste, Dus and Bluffmaster. Vishal Dadlani is also the vocalist of Mumbai-based electronic band Pentagram. He collaborated with Imogen Heap on the song "Minds Without Fear" for an episode of The Dewarists.

Shekhar Ravjiani is a trained classical singer (under Ustad Niaz Ahmed Khan). He learned to play the accordion from his father, a music enthusiast, Hasmukh Ravjiani. Shekhar was a participant of Zee TV singing contest Sa Re Ga Ma Pa in 1997. He composed and sung Marathi songs "Saazni" in 2012 and "Saavli" (with Sunidhi Chauhan) in 2013.

Annual Central European Bollywood Awards

Apsara Film & Television Producers Guild Award

Asian Film Awards

BIG Star Entertainment Awards

Filmfare Awards

Global Indian Music Academy Awards

International Indian Film Academy Awards

References 

Lists of awards received by Indian musician